Lydia Patterson Institute is a Methodist Christian college-preparatory school located in El Paso, Texas, United States. Founded in 1913 it offers programs for Spanish-speaking children, primarily from Ciudad Juárez, Chihuahua to attend high school in the United States and attend a Methodist graduate university. All high school classes are taught in English, and the school is accredited by the Southern Association of Colleges and Schools.

History
At the beginning of the 20th century in El Paso, there were very few educational opportunities for poor Hispanic boys. Since the State of Texas did not provide public education of any kind for non-English speaking students, most Hispanic children in the Second Ward were not receiving any formal education.
Mrs. Lydia Patterson, a Methodist laywoman, recognized the gravity of this problem, and in 1906, she began to set up day classes for boys in the homes of area Methodists. Upon her death in 1909, her husband Millard Patterson, a local attorney, decided to memorialize her by establishing the school that she had envisioned, and in 1913, construction began on the Lydia Patterson Institute.
In 1921, LPI became one of the first schools in the country to emphasize the teaching of English as a Second Language, or ESL, merging students into the appropriate grade upon completion of the ESL program.

References

External links 
 Lydia Patterson Website
 Lydia Patterson Facebook Page
 Lydia Patterson students cross border to forge futures
 CNN Report on LPI
 LPI Tribune Website

Education in El Paso, Texas
Schools in El Paso County, Texas
Private high schools in Texas
Private middle schools in Texas
Educational institutions established in 1913
High schools in El Paso, Texas
Methodist schools in the United States
1913 establishments in Texas
Christian schools in Texas